Keo Soksela (born 1 August 1997) is a Cambodian footballer who plays for Visakha in the Cambodian League and the Cambodia national team.

International career
Soksela made his senior debut in a friendly match against Timor-Leste on 12 October 2018.

Honours

Club
Phnom Penh Crown
Cambodian League: 2015

Individual
Cambodian League: 2015 : Best Goalkeeper

References

External links 

Living people
1997 births
Cambodian footballers
Cambodia international footballers
Association football goalkeepers
Phnom Penh Crown FC players
Sportspeople from Phnom Penh
Competitors at the 2019 Southeast Asian Games
Southeast Asian Games competitors for Cambodia
Visakha FC players
Cambodian Premier League players